Ronald Francis Clements (born April 25, 1953) is an American animator, film director, screenwriter, and film producer. He often collaborates with fellow director John Musker and is best known for writing and directing the Disney films The Great Mouse Detective (1986), The Little Mermaid (1989), Aladdin (1992), Hercules (1997), Treasure Planet (2002), The Princess and the Frog (2009), and Moana (2016).

Life and career
Clements was born in Sioux City, Iowa, the son of Gertrude (née Gereau) and Joseph Clements.

Clements began his career as an animator for Hanna-Barbera. After a few months there, he was accepted into Disney's Talent Development Program, an animator training ground and workshop. After that, he served a two-year apprenticeship with famed animator Frank Thomas, a supervising animator of Disney films such as Peter Pan (1953), Lady and the Tramp (1955), and The Aristocats (1970). Clements made his feature debut as a character animator on The Rescuers and Pete's Dragon in 1977. In 1981, he became the supervising animator on The Fox and the Hound. Future partner John Musker worked as a character animator under him, and Clements later teamed up with Musker as story artists on The Black Cauldron before they were removed from the project. In 1982, Clements proposed adapting the children's book series Basil of Baker Street by Eve Titus into an animated feature and, along with story artist Pete Young, it was pitched to Ron Miller. Because the animators were displeased with the direction of The Black Cauldron was heading, Basil of Baker Street was approved as an alternative project. Burny Mattinson and Musker were assigned as the original directors while Dave Michener was brought in as an additional director. Due to a shortened production schedule and multiple story rewrites, Roy E. Disney assigned Mattinson to serve as director/producer while Clements was brought in as another director.

While working on The Great Mouse Detective, newly appointed Disney CEO and chairman Michael Eisner and Jeffrey Katzenberg issued invitations to the animation staff for their first held "gong show" session. Demanding only five new ideas, Clements went to a bookstore and discovered Hans Christian Andersen's The Little Mermaid. Clements wrote and presented a two-page treatment of Mermaid to Disney Studios Chief Jeffrey Katzenberg at a "gong show" idea suggestion meeting, as well as conceptualized the idea of Treasure Planet. At the gong show session, Mermaid was rejected for its similarities to Splash while Planet was rejected by Eisner because Paramount Pictures was developing a Star Trek sequel with a Treasure Island angle (that went eventually unproduced). The next morning, Katzenberg approached Clements and asked him to expand his initial treatment. With Mermaid in production in 1986, Clements and Musker were later joined by Off-Broadway musical composers Howard Ashman and Alan Menken who collaborated on the song and musical score. Released in November 1989, The Little Mermaid was praised as a milestone in rebirth of Disney animation by film critics and collected a domestic gross of $84 million, cumulatively receiving $184.2 million worldwide. When work on Mermaid was wrapped, Clements and Musker re-developed their idea for Treasure Planet, but the studio still expressed disinterest. Instead, the two directors were offered three projects in development: Swan Lake, King of the Jungle, and Aladdin. The directors chose Aladdin because they thought the story would suit a wackier, faster-paced, and more contemporary mood than that found in then-recent Disney animated films.

Working from Ashman and Menken's treatment and musical score, the two delivered a story reel to Katzenberg in April 1991, which was strongly disapproved of. Jettisoning multiple characters and story ideas and adding Ted Elliott and Terry Rossio as co-screenwriters, the production team restructured the entire story in eight days. Released in November 1992, Aladdin received positive reviews from critics, and became the first animated film to gross over $200 million domestically. Following work on Aladdin, Clements, along with Musker, resumed their work on Treasure Planet, which was again turned down by Katzenberg in 1993, who disapproved of setting the adaptation of a classic adventure tale in outer space. A deal was struck with the two directors to create another commercial film before he would approve Treasure Planet. Rejecting projects in development such as Don Quixote, The Odyssey, and Around the World in Eighty Days, they were later informed of animator Joe Haidar's pitch for a Hercules feature, and signed onto the project. During production on Hercules, in 1995, Clements and Musker signed a seven-year contract deal with the studio which stipulated following Hercules, the studio would produce Treasure Planet or another project of their choosing.

Treasure Planet was eventually approved for production and subsequently released in 2002 to mixed critical reception. The film performed poorly at the box office, costing $140 million to create while earning only $38 million in the United States and Canada and just shy of $110 million worldwide. Despite this, it was nominated for Best Animated Feature at the 75th Academy Awards, marking his first Academy Award nomination. 

Following Treasure Planet, Clements and Musker later inherited Fraidy Cat, which was originally a project developed by Dutch animation director Piet Kroon. However, David Stainton, then-president of Walt Disney Feature Animation, refused to green-light the project, which was followed with Clements and Musker's resignation from Disney in September 2005. When John Lasseter was appointed chief creative officer over Disney Feature Animation in February 2006, he invited Clements and Musker back to Disney to oversee production on The Frog Princess, and were officially confirmed as directors in the following July. Later re-titled The Princess and the Frog, the film received positive reviews and grossed $267 million worldwide.

After directing The Princess and the Frog, Clements and Musker started working on an adaptation of Terry Pratchett's Mort, but obtaining the film rights prevented them from continuing with the project. To avoid similar problems, they pitched three new ideas, where by 2011, the two directors started developing the film based on an original idea. In late 2012, the duo announced that they will be directing a new film in the future, but they have their lips sealed for the title, the plot, and the animation style. In July 2013, it was revealed that the film, titled Moana, would be "a Polynesian tale involving the island folk and the idols made famous the world over". On November 10, 2014, Disney confirmed Moana would be released on November 23, 2016.

Legacy
Clement's short film Shades of Sherlock Holmes was preserved by the Academy Film Archive in 2012.

Personal life
Clements has been married to his wife Tamara Lee Glumace, since February 25, 1989.

Filmography

Feature films

Short films

Documentaries

Awards and nominations

Collaborations

John Musker and Clements have cast certain actors in more than one of their films.

References

Bibliography

External links

1953 births
Animators from Iowa
American animated film directors
American animated film producers
Animation screenwriters
Living people
Film directors from Iowa
Walt Disney Animation Studios people
Writers from Sioux City, Iowa
Annie Award winners